Sarmiento is a crater on Mercury.  Its name was adopted by the International Astronomical Union (IAU) in 1979, and is named for the Argentine writer Domingo Faustino Sarmiento.

References

Impact craters on Mercury